Ethmia penesella is a moth in the family Depressariidae. It is found in Japan and Taiwan.

The forewings are grey marked with ten black spots arranged into two main groups which contain five spots each. The hindwings are whitish grey with costal brushes.

References

Moths described in 2000
penesella